The women's tournament of the 2011 World Senior Curling Championships was held from April 15 to 24, 2011. Eleven women's teams played in a round-robin, and the top four teams will advance to the semifinals, where they played a single-knockout round to determine the winner.

Teams

Round-robin standings
Final round-robin standings

Round-robin results
All draw times are listed in Central Standard Time (UTC-06).

Draw 1
Sunday, April 17, 08:00

Draw 2
Sunday, April 17, 18:00

Draw 3
Monday, April 18, 11:00

Draw 4
Monday, April 18, 18:00

Draw 5
Tuesday, April 19, 11:30

Draw 6
Tuesday, April 19, 21:30

Draw 7
Wednesday, April 20, 11:00

Draw 8
Wednesday, April 20, 18:00

Draw 9
Thursday, April 21, 08:00

*A member of the Scottish rink sustained an injury during play, so the Irish rink opted to forfeit the game.

Draw 10
Thursday, April 21, 18:00

Draw 11
Friday, April 22, 08:00

Playoffs

Semifinals
Saturday, April 23, 9:00

Bronze medal game
Saturday, April 23, 14:00

Gold medal game
Saturday, April 23, 14:00

References

External links

World Senior Curling Championships
World Curling Championships, 2011
2011 in American sports
2011 in sports in Minnesota
Women's curling competitions in the United States
International sports competitions hosted by the United States
Curling in Minnesota
International curling competitions hosted by the United States
Sports in Saint Paul, Minnesota
Women's sports in Minnesota